Sumo (also known as Sumu) is the collective name for a group of Misumalpan languages spoken in Nicaragua and Honduras. Hale & Salamanca (2001) classify the Sumu languages into a northern Mayangna, composed of the Tawahka and Panamahka dialects, and southern Ulwa. Sumu specialist Ken Hale considered the differences between Ulwa and Mayangna in both vocabulary and morphology to be so considerable that he prefers to speak of Ulwa as a language distinct from the northern Sumu varieties.

Phonology

Consonants

Vowels

Sources
Hale, Ken, and Danilo Salamanca (2001) "Theoretical and Universal Implications of Certain Verbal Entries in Dictionaries of the Misumalpan Languages", in Frawley, Hill & Munro eds. Making Dictionaries: Preserving indigenous Languages of the Americas. University of California Press.
Norwood, Susan (1997). Gramática de la lengua sumu. Managua: CIDCA.

References

Misumalpan languages
Languages of Nicaragua
North Caribbean Coast Autonomous Region
Languages of Honduras